Heinz Christian Pander, also Christian Heinrich Pander ( – ), was a Russian Empire ethnic Baltic German biologist and embryologist.

Biography 
In 1817 he received his doctorate from the University of Würzburg, and spent several years (1827–1842), performing scientific research from his estate in Carnikava on the banks of the Gauja River near Riga. In 1820 he took part in a scientific expedition to Bokhara as a naturalist. In 1826 he became a member of the Saint Petersburg Academy of Sciences.

Research 
Pander studied the chick embryo and discovered the germ layers (i.e., three distinct regions of the embryo that give rise to the specific organ system). Because of these findings, he is considered by many to be the "founder of embryology". His work in embryology was continued by Karl Ernst von Baer (1792-1876), who expanded Pander's concept of germ layers to include all vertebrates.

Pander performed important studies in the field of paleontology, being known for his extensive research on fossils found in the Devonian and Silurian geological strata of the Baltic regions. His study of trilobites from this age led to the adjective 'Panderian', first used by the Canadian palaeontologist, Elkanah Billings. Pander is credited as the first scientist to describe primitive creatures known as conodonts.

Today the Pander Society is an international association of palaeontologists and stratigraphers with a common interest in the study of conodonts.

He died in Saint Petersburg.

Eponyms

Pander's eponyms are:
Pander's islands or blood islands

Selected writings 
 Beiträge zur Entwickelungsgeschichte des Hühnchens im Eye, (Contributions to the embryology involving the chick egg), (1817).
 Beiträge zur Naturkunde aus den Ostseeprovinzen Rußlands, (Contributions on the natural history of the Baltic regions) Dorpat, (1820).
 Vergleichende Osteologie (Comparative osteology) seven volumes, with Eduard Joseph d'Alton, Bonn: Weber, (1821–1828).
 Beiträge zur geognosie des russischen reiches, (Contributions to the geology of the Russian Empire), 1830.
 Monographie der Fossilen Fische des silurischen Systems der Russisch-Baltischen Gouvernements (Monograph of fossil fish from the Silurian stratum of the Baltic regions), St. Petersburg, (1856).
 Ueber die Placodermen des devonischen Systems, (On placoderms of the Devonian system), 1857.
 Über die ctenodopterinen des devonischen systems, 1858
 Über die saurodipterinen, dendrodonten, glyptolepiden und cheirolepiden des devonischen systems, 1860.

See also 
 List of Baltic German scientists

References 
 Gilbert, Developmental biology
 Latvian Technical and Scientific Achievements

1794 births
1865 deaths
Scientists from Riga
People from the Governorate of Livonia
Baltic German people from the Russian Empire
Paleontologists from the Russian Empire
Conodont specialists
Explorers from the Russian Empire
Biologists from the Russian Empire
Germ layers
Demidov Prize laureates
Full members of the Saint Petersburg Academy of Sciences